The year 1609 in science and technology involved some significant events.

Astronomy
 July 26 – English scientist Thomas Harriot becomes the first to draw an astronomical object after viewing it through a telescope: he draws a map of the Moon, preceding Galileo by several months.
 Johannes Kepler publishes Astronomia nova, containing his first two laws of planetary motion.

Biology
 Charles Butler publishes The Feminine Monarchie, or, A Treatise Concerning Bees.

Exploration
 April 4 – Henry Hudson sets out from Amsterdam in the Halve Maen.
 August 28 – Hudson finds Delaware Bay.
 September 11–12 – Hudson sails into Upper New York Bay and begins a journey up the Hudson River.

Medicine
 Louise Bourgeois Boursier publishes Diverse Observations on Sterility; Loss of the Ovum after Fecundation, Fecundity and Childbirth; Diseases of Women and of Newborn Infants in Paris, the first book on obstetrics written by a woman.
 Jacques Guillemeau publishes De l'heureux accouchement des femmes in which he describes a method of assisted breech delivery.

Technology
 Cornelius Drebbel invents the thermostat.

Births
 June 29 – Pierre Paul Riquet, French engineer and canal builder (died 1680)
 October 8 – John Clarke, English physician (died 1676)

Deaths
 March 26 – John Dee, English alchemist, astrologer and mathematician (born 1527)
 April 4 – Carolus Clusius, Flemish botanist (born 1525)
 August 4 - Joseph Duchesne, French physician and alchemist (born c.1544).
 August 16 : André du Laurens, French physician and gerontologist (born 1558).
 December – Oswald Croll, German iatrochemist (born c. 1563)

References

 
17th century in science
1600s in science